Lone Signal was a crowdfunded active SETI project designed to send interstellar messages from Earth to a possible extraterrestrial civilization. Founded by businessman Pierre Fabre and supported by several entrepreneurs, Lone Signal was based at the Jamesburg Earth Station in Carmel, California.

The project's beacon, which commenced continuous operations on June 17, 2013, transmitted short, 144-character messages by citizens of Earth to the red dwarf star Gliese 526, located 17.6 light-years away from Earth in the constellation Boötes. The Lone Signal team hoped to earn  million to construct a network of satellite dishes across the Earth's surface, which could beam messages to many regions of the Milky Way galaxy. The project ceased transmission shortly after it began, due to lack of funding.

Message components
Lone Signal's message consists of two key components, a background hailing component and a more complex message component. The hailing component, designed by planetary scientist Michael W. Busch, uses a universal binary encoding system, which goes through an octal intermediary, representing numbers, mathematical operators, or other symbols. Each value corresponds to a single unique frequency. The offsets between those frequencies are set to be much larger than the bit rate (i.e. if transmitting at 100 Hz, the offsets between adjacent frequencies will be ~300 Hz). Using these code blocks, coherent mathematical statements about the laws of physics and Earth's location in the galaxy are produced. The hailing message repeats on average three times in order to allow the recipient to decode it at any time when observation begins, with some parts repeating more often than others. The hailing component was designed to be easily decoded by an extraterrestrial civilization, which was confirmed by a double-blind experiment.

The hailing component is not an end in itself, but is designed to be a "Rosetta Stone" toward understanding the more complex message component, consisting of brief, 144-character statements by the general public. These messages, with widely varying languages and contents, were posted from the Lone Signal website. Individuals who have signed up to send messages with Lone Signal, collectively known as the "beaming community", were permitted to send one message for free, and thereafter required to purchase "message credits" of $0.25 per message sent in order to fund the operation of the project. The content of messages sent via Lone Signal could be syndicated to the Twitter and Facebook accounts of beaming community members as desired. It was in this beaming community user space that an attempt was being made to extend the syntax used in the hailing message to communicate in a way that, while neither mathematical nor strictly logical, was nonetheless designed to be understandable given the prior definition of terms and concepts in the hailing message.

Potential dangers and detectability 
Various commentators have identified several dangers with messaging extraterrestrial intelligence, which chief scientific officer Jacob Haqq-Misra covered in a 2013 paper before joining Lone Signal. In his paper, Haqq-Misra stated that while ordinary communication which might involve inadvertent leakage into space would not pose a threat, the dangers of actively beaming messages to extraterrestrial intelligences, and hence a determination of whether or not such beaming activities should be carried out, are uncertain.

Upon becoming an executive of Lone Signal, Haqq-Misra stated his belief that extraterrestrial civilizations probably already know of humanity's existence, and reaffirmed his position that the cultural impact of extraterrestrial contact is unknowable. He based this belief on the fact that various other radio sources have been broadcasting into space for decades, and would be detectable to any civilization with sufficiently large radio telescopes. At the same time, though, the previous messages from the most powerful beaming sources were intermittent, while Lone Signal aimed to establish the first continuous beam to space.

References

External links 

Official web site
Lone Signal Media Channel on YouTube
Extending the syntax used by the Lone Signal Active SETI project
Lone Signal's message: Don't wait for aliens to drop in, call them first

Search for extraterrestrial intelligence
Interstellar messages
2013 establishments in California